The 2014 national road cycling championships began in Australia with the time trial event (both men and women) on January 8, as is tradition.

Jerseys
The winner of each national championship wears the national jersey in all their races for the next year in the respective discipline, apart from the World Championships and the Olympics, or unless they are wearing a category leader's jersey in a stage race. Most national champion jerseys tend to represent a country's flag or use the colours from it. Jerseys may also feature traditional sporting colours of a country that are not derived from a national flag, such as the green and gold on the jerseys of Australian national champions.

2014 champions

Men's Elite

Women's

See also

 2014 in men's road cycling
 2014 in women's road cycling

Notes

References

National Cycling Championships, 2014
National road cycling championships by year
2014 in men's road cycling
2014 in women's road cycling